The 2010 Supercupa României was the 12th edition of Romania's season opener cup competition. The match was played in Cluj-Napoca at Dr. Constantin Rădulescu on 18 July 2010, and was contested between Liga I title holders and Supercup defending champions, CFR Cluj and Liga I runners-up, FC Unirea Urziceni. This was the first edition of the Supercup to face the Liga I winners and the league's runners-up, since CFR won the double in 2010. The new format of the competition, in which the double winner plays the league runner-up at home ground was proposed and adopted by Romanian Football Federation the same year.

Cluj won the game after penalties. After regular time the game ended 1–1 after goals of Dominique Kivuvu and again Kivuvu, but this time in the wrong goal. In Extra time Urziceni had the edge early after Laurenţiu Marinescu scored a goal to give them a one-goal lead. In injury time of the 1st half of the extra time Ciprian Deac scored the equalizer to send the game in penalties. In those penalty shootout no player of Urziceni was able to score. Also 2 player of Cluj missed but because Felice Piccolo and Emil Dică scored, Cluj won the trophy which was handed to them by Cluj-Napoca's mayor, Sorin Apostu.

Match

Details

References

External links
Romania - List of Super Cup Finals, RSSSF.com

Super
Supercupa României
CFR Cluj matches
Association football penalty shoot-outs